Senshi-Con is an annual anime convention in Anchorage, Alaska. Founded in 2005, it was the first pioneering anime convention in Alaska. The name is a combination of the English word convention and the Japanese word senshi (戦士 in Japanese), meaning warrior. The convention is organized by the Alaska Association of Asian Cultural Learning.

Programming
Attendees may bring a fake prop weapon as long as it complements the costume; however, live steel weapons and any gun replicas (even toys) are not allowed. Besides a cosplay contest, there are video game competitions, anime screenings, karaoke, Cosplay Chess, and art displays. Notable persons from the world of Japanese comics and animation make an appearance and are available for autographs. Throughout the day, various contests, game shows, and skits take place on stage. While the Senshi-Con attendance levels are lower than those of the more popular conventions in other parts of North America, the staff points out that the lines at such convention are shorter, and the planning is more thorough.

History
The first Senshi-Con was held in 2005 at West High School in Anchorage, Alaska. It was founded and organized by now-voice actress Kira Buckland and the West High School Anime Club. As the convention staff graduated from high school, the convention was moved to the University of Alaska Anchorage.

It was announced on September 30, 2012 that Senshi-con would be changing venues to the Egan Center in downtown Anchorage.  The convention moved to the Dena'ina Civic and Convention Center in 2017. Senshi-Con 2020 was cancelled due to the COVID-19 pandemic.

Event history

References

External links 
 

Anime conventions in the United States
Recurring events established in 2005
2005 establishments in Alaska
Annual events in Alaska
Festivals in Alaska
Culture of Anchorage, Alaska
Tourist attractions in Anchorage, Alaska
University of Alaska Anchorage